Karimabad-e Seyyed Ali Khamenehi (also Romanized as Karīmābād-e Seyyed ʿAlī Khāmeneh’ī; also known as Ḩeydarābād and Karīmābād) is a village in Poshtkuh Rural District, in the Central District of Khash County, Sistan and Baluchestan Province, Iran. At the 2006 census, its population was 793, in 145 families.

References 

Populated places in Khash County